Gunnar Jakobsson was a Finnish figure skater who competed in men's singles.

He won the bronze medal at the 1923 European Figure Skating Championships in Oslo.

Competitive highlights

References 

Finnish male single skaters
Date of birth missing
Date of death missing